Cameron Carolissen (born 16 January 1996) is a South African professional darts player who plays in Professional Darts Corporation (PDC) events. He qualified for the 2021 PDC World Darts Championship via an International Qualifier.

Career

2020
Carolissen qualified for the 2021 PDC World Darts Championship after winning the PDC African Qualifier, beating two-time World Championship participant Charles Losper 7-4 in the final. He received a bye into the second round of the tournament after his opponent Martijn Kleermaker withdrew due to contracting COVID-19 and his replacement Josh Payne was also ruled out after he had to self-isolate due to coming into contact with someone with COVID-19. In the second round, he was beaten 3-1 by Danny Noppert.

World Championship results

PDC
 2021: Last 64 (lost to Danny Noppert 1–3) (sets)

References

Living people
1996 births
Professional Darts Corporation associate players
South African darts players
Sportspeople from Cape Town
Sportspeople from London